Giorgio Pighi (born 4 April 1949) is an Italian politician, lawyer and professor.

He is a member of the Democratic Party.

Biography 
He was born in Modena, Italy. He graduated from the Muratori classical high school in Modena and then graduated with honors, in 1973, at the local university with a thesis on deviance and juvenile criminal law. In the following three years, he specialized in criminology with honors at the University of Genoa. In 1976 he obtained the qualification to solicitor. He is Professor of criminal law and urban security policies at the University of Modena and Reggio Emilia. In 1995 he was elected municipal councilor in the Municipality of Modena on the Democratic Party of the Left lists, a role he will hold until his election as mayor on 13 June 2004. He took office as Mayor of Modena on 14 June 2004. He was reconfirmed at the head of the city on 7 June 2009.

References

External links 
 

Living people
1949 births
Democratic Party (Italy) politicians
Mayors of Modena
21st-century Italian politicians
21st-century Italian lawyers
Academic staff of the University of Modena and Reggio Emilia